Milagre dos peixes is an album by Brazilian singer and composer Milton Nascimento released in 1973 by EMI/Odeon (now Universal Music Group). The album (released on one 12-inch LP and one 7-inch EP) comprises 11 songs, 8 of which are instrumental.

Recording
Three of the eight instrumental tracks initially featured lyrics, but were censored by the Brazilian military regime; Nascimento elected to remove the lyrics rather than alter them.

Reception
In 2007, Rolling Stone Brasil ranked it 63rd in its list of the 100 greatest Brazilian records.

Track listing

References

1973 albums
Milton Nascimento albums
Portuguese-language albums